Yannick Borel (born 5 November 1988) is a French right-handed épée fencer.

Borel is a two-time team European champion, four-time individual European champion, four-time team world champion, and 2018 individual world champion. 

A three-time Olympian, Borel is a 2016 team Olympic champion. 

Borel competed in the 2012 London Olympic Games, the 2016 Rio de Janeiro Olympic Games, and the 2020 Tokyo Olympic Games.

Career

Early years
Borel was born in Guadeloupe, overseas France. When he had to choose an extracurricular activity at the age of ten, he hesitated between fencing and gwo ka, a genre of Guadeloupe folk music. He chose the former because the club was close to his school and several of his friends already fenced. Five-time Olympic medallist Laura Flessel, also from Guadeloupe, was also a major inspiration for him. He learnt épée under coaches Rudy Plicoste and Barbara Paulin.

At the age of fifteen he was noticed by France's head coach Jérôme Roussat, who offered him a spot at the national junior training centre in Reims, Metropolitan France. Borel's parents refused, because they wanted him to finish high school before focussing on sport. He was allowed to go after he obtained his baccalauréat in 2007 and began training with the best junior fencers alongside to his physical therapy  studies. That year he was selected into the French national junior team that won a silver medal at the Junior European Championships in Prague. The next season, he earned a silver medal at the Herakled Cup in Budapest and won the Uhlmann Cup in Laupheim, two events of the Junior World Cup. He also became junior national champion.

Senior career
In 2009 Borel gave up his physical therapy studies, which were too demanding for a high-performance athlete, and switched to physical education at INSEP, where he trained with the senior national team. He took part in the 2009 Summer Universiade, but did not earn any medal. Two quarter-finals finishes in the 2010–11 season had him selected into the senior national team for the first time. At the 2011 European Championships in Sheffield he reached the table of 16, defeating 2010 World silver medallist and teammate Gauthier Grumier along the way, but he yielded to Germany's Jörg Fiedler and finished 11th. In the team event France saw off Switzerland, Ukraine and finally Hungary to earn a gold medal.

After this result Borel transferred from the Cercle d'Escrime de Châlons to the Levallois Sporting Club, where he joined teammates Ulrich Robeiri and Gauthier Grumier. At the 2011 World Championships in Catania Borel reached again the table of 16, before being stopped by Korea's Park Kyoung-doo. In the team event France cruised to the quarter-finals, then defeated Germany, South Korea and Hungary to post their sixth World title in a row. Borel finished the season World No.14, a career best .

In the 2011–12 season Borel climbed his first World Cup podium with a bronze medal in Legnano. He qualified to the 2012 Summer Olympics as one of the two top-ranked Europeans. As men's team épée did not feature on the Olympic programme, World Championships were held separately in April. France defeated Russia, then prevailed by a single hit over Italy in the semi-finals. They failed to establish a new record of seven straight World titles after a surprise 37–44 defeat against the United States and had to settle for silver. For his Olympic début Borel defeated Ukraine's Dmytro Karyuchenko and Switzerland's Fabian Kauter. In the quarter-finals he met Norway's Bartosz Piasecki and took an early 6–2 lead, but failed to press his advantage and was finally defeated 14–15 by Piasecki, who eventually won the silver medal.

After the Games Borel was dropped from the national team and had two dry seasons, although he was France's flagbearer at the 2013 University Games. He bounced back in the 2014–15 season with a silver medal at the Heidenheim World Cup.

He competed for France at the 2016 Olympics, where he was part of the French team that won the team gold medal.  Because of this, he was made a knight of the Legion of Honour.

He won the gold medal in the men's épée event at the 2022 European Fencing Championships held in Antalya, Turkey.

Medal Record

Olympic Games

World Championship

European Championship

Grand Prix

World Cup

References

External links

Profile at the European Fencing Confederation

French male épée fencers
French people of Guadeloupean descent
Olympic fencers of France
Fencers at the 2012 Summer Olympics
Fencers at the 2016 Summer Olympics
People from Pointe-à-Pitre
1988 births
Living people
Fencers at the 2015 European Games
European Games medalists in fencing
European Games competitors for France
Olympic gold medalists for France
Olympic medalists in fencing
Medalists at the 2016 Summer Olympics
Universiade medalists in fencing
Universiade gold medalists for France
Medalists at the 2013 Summer Universiade
Medalists at the 2015 Summer Universiade
Fencers at the 2020 Summer Olympics
20th-century French people
21st-century French people
World Fencing Championships medalists